Sleep in Your Grave is the debut album by the American metalcore band Manntis. The album was released on June 28, 2005 through Century Media Records. Some special international editions of the album featured three bonus tracks (demos) and two enhanced video clips.

Track listing
 "Axe of Redemption" – 2:43
 "Shades of Hatred" – 2:09
 "Approach" – 3:00
 "Reflections of You" – 2:44
 "My Enemy" – 2:07
 "A New Breed of Life" – 2:29
 "Second Life Ahead" – 3:12
 "Weathered Soul" – 3:05
 "Resist and Overcome" – 2:06
 "Sleep in Your Grave" – 2:57
 "The End's Where It Begins" – 2:06

Special international edition(s)

Bonus tracks
 "A New Breed of Life" (Demo) – 2:27
 "Shades of Hatred" (Demo) – 2:19
 "My Enemy" (Demo) – 2:46

Video clips
 "A New Breed of Life" (Live video)
 "Axe of Redemption" (Music video)

Personnel

Musicians
 Jake Sirokman – vocals
 Adair Cobley – lead guitar, backing vocals
 Jeremy Swanson – rhythm guitar, backing vocals
 Clint Gregory – bass
 Jimmie Sanders – drums

Credits
 Cameron Webb – Mixing
 Cameron Webb and Sergio Chavez – Engineering
 Kevin Bartley – Mastering (Capitol Mastering)

2005 debut albums
Century Media Records albums
Manntis albums